The Antoine River is a  tributary of the Little Missouri River in southwestern Arkansas in the United States.  Via the Little Missouri, Ouachita and Red rivers, it is part of the watershed of the Mississippi River.  According to the GNIS, it has also been known as Antoine Creek.  A short headwater tributary of the river is known as the Little Antoine River.

Course
For most of its course the river forms the boundary between Pike County and Clark County. For most of its length, the Antoine River crosses the Athens Piedmont Plateau, a series of east–west ridges that serve as the foothills of the Ouachita Mountains. The Antoine River is notable for rapid changes in water level after rains. It is primarily a clear and rocky stream, the last free-flowing river of any size in the Athens Plateau that has not been dammed.

Tributaries
Most tributaries of the Antoine River are small rocky streams that flow in from the west.  These include Wall Creek, Woodall Creek, Camp Creek, Suck Creek, and Wolf Creek on the west, and Little Antoine Creek, Mathews Creek and Brushy Creek on the east.  The largest tributary of the Antoine River is Wolf Creek in southern Pike County.

See also
List of Arkansas rivers

References

DeLorme (2004).  Arkansas Atlas & Gazetteer.  Yarmouth, Maine: DeLorme.  .

Rivers of Arkansas
Rivers of Clark County, Arkansas
Rivers of Pike County, Arkansas
Little Missouri River (Arkansas)